Frank Arthur Hooper (April 21, 1895 – February 11, 1985) was a United States district judge of the United States District Court for the Northern District of Georgia.

Education and career

Born in Americus, Georgia, Hooper attended Henry W. Grady High School (then Boys High School) in Atlanta, Georgia. He attended the George School of Technology (now the Georgia Institute of Technology) and then received a Bachelor of Laws and a Master of Laws from Atlanta Law School. He read law in 1916. He was a law clerk for Judge Walter F. George of the Georgia Court of Appeals from 1917 to 1919. He was a United States Naval Reserve Lieutenant in 1919. He was in private practice of law in Atlanta from 1919 to 1943. He was a member of the Georgia House of Representatives from 1925 to 1928. He was a Judge of the Georgia Court of Appeals in 1933. He was an instructor at Atlanta Law School from 1934 to 1943. He was an assistant city attorney of Atlanta from 1940 to 1943. He was a Judge of the Superior Court of Georgia for the Atlanta Judicial Circuit from 1943 to 1949. He served as president of the Georgia Tech Alumni Association from 1945 to 1947.

Federal judicial service

Hooper received a recess appointment from President Harry S. Truman on October 21, 1949, to a seat on the United States District Court for the Northern District of Georgia vacated by Judge Robert Lee Russell. He was nominated to the same seat by President Truman on January 5, 1950. He was confirmed by the United States Senate on February 21, 1950, and received his commission on February 23, 1950. He served as Chief Judge from 1950 to 1965. He assumed senior status on June 29, 1967. His service was terminated on February 11, 1985, due to his death in Atlanta.

References

Sources
 

1895 births
1985 deaths
People from Americus, Georgia
Military personnel from Georgia (U.S. state)
Atlanta Law School alumni
Georgia (U.S. state) state court judges
Georgia Court of Appeals judges
Judges of the United States District Court for the Northern District of Georgia
United States district court judges appointed by Harry S. Truman
20th-century American judges
Georgia Tech alumni
United States Navy officers
Members of the Georgia House of Representatives
United States federal judges admitted to the practice of law by reading law